The Seidelmann 37 is an American sailboat that was designed by Bob Seidelmann as a racer-cruiser and first built in 1980.

Production
The design was built by Seidelmann Yachts in Berlin, New Jersey, United States, but it is now out of production.

Design
The Seidelmann 37 is a recreational keelboat, built predominantly of fiberglass, with teak wood trim. It has a masthead sloop rig, with aluminum spars, a raked stem, a raised reverse transom, an internally mounted spade-type rudder controlled by a wheel and a fixed fin keel. It displaces  and carries  of ballast.

The design was produced with several different keel and rig combinations.

The design has sleeping accommodation for six people. There is a bow "V"-berth, two settee berths in the main cabin and a quarter berth aft, with a sixth, optional pilot berth above the settee berths. The galley is located aft, on the starboard side and includes a two-burner, alcohol-fired stove and oven, plus a sink with pressurized water. There is a navigation station on the port side that is normally angled, but can be leveled for use as counter space. The head is located on the port side and just aft of the bow "V"-berth. The cabin woodwork is all of teak.

Ventilation is provided by two dorade vents, bow cabin and main cabin deck hatches, plus four opening ports.

The cockpit is a "T"-shaped design. The halyards, topping lift and reefing lines are all mounted internally. The cockpit has two genoa sheeting winches, plus there are two additional winches on the mast for the halyards. There are also genoa sheet tracks mounted inboard. There is an anchor well in the bow.

The design has a PHRF racing average handicap of 120 with the deep keel fitted.

Operational history
In a 1994 review, Richard Sherwood wrote, "like many Seidelmanns, this one has a very tall rig. The beam, however, is wide in relation to length. The result is a spacious interior."

See also
List of sailing boat types

Similar sailboats
Bayfield 36
Catalina 36
C&C 36-1
C&C 36R
Columbia 36
Coronado 35
Crealock 37
CS 36
Ericson 36
Frigate 36
Hinterhoeller F3
Hunter 36
Hunter 36-2
Hunter 36 Legend
Hunter 36 Vision
Invader 36
Islander 36
Nonsuch 36
Portman 36
S2 11.0
Vancouver 36 (Harris)
Watkins 36
Watkins 36C

References

Keelboats
1980s sailboat type designs
Sailing yachts
Sailboat type designs by Bob Seidelmann
Sailboat types built by Seidelmann Yachts